Blo.Torch is the first album by the melodic death metal band Blo.Torch. It was released in 1999 on Earache Records.

Track listing

References

1999 debut albums
Blo.Torch albums
Earache Records albums